Gary Farrell (born 1952) is a California winemaker, specializing in the production of Pinot noir and Chardonnay from Sonoma County’s Russian River Valley.  Until 2013 he was producing his luxury line of wines under the Alysian (ah-liss-ee-uhn) brand, which he co-founded in 2007 with investment banker Bill Hambrecht and Denise Sanders.

Early life and education
Farrell was born in Pasadena, California on April 20, 1952. He studied Political Science and Criminal Law at Sonoma State University in 1970. This relocation to Sonoma County placed him in one of California's most promising wine regions, and he chose a career in wine production.

Career
Farrell's early mentors included Joe Rochioli, Robert Stemmler, Davis Bynum and Tom Dehlinger.  After several years as an apprentice, he took the head-winemaker position at Davis Bynum Winery in 1978.  Soon thereafter, he produced inaugural releases for Rochioli Winery, Limerick Lane and Moshin Vineyards.

During the mid-1990s, Farrell purchased land and developed Starr Ridge and Cresta Ridge vineyards. In 1998, he constructed Pinot noir facilities on a hilltop near Healdsburg for the production of his wines.

In 2004, Farrell sold the “Gary Farrell” brand and winery to Allied Domecq. Today the winery is owned by Bill Price, the managing partner of Kistler Vineyard and owner of Three Sticks and The Adobe, Lutum and the Durell and Gap’s Crown vineyards; and a group of investors including Pete Scott, the former CFO of Beringer Wine Estates; and Walt Klenz; former president and CEO of Beringer Wine Estates.

In 2007, he partnered with longtime colleagues Bill Hambrecht and Denise Sanders to micro-produce Pinot noir and Chardonnay under the new Alysian label.

References

External links
 http://www.alysianwines.com/
 http://www.garyfarrellwines.com/

1952 births
People from Pasadena, California
American winemakers
Sonoma State University alumni
Living people